Mladen Mićanović (born 2 December 1996) is a Serbian footballer who plays as a midfielder for Mačva Šabac.

Career

Javor Ivanjica
Born in Šabac, Mićanović firstly played football as a youth for local club Mačva. In the summer of 2013, he joined Javor Ivanjica, and was immediately loaned to Serbian League side Lokomotiva Beograd for the 2013–14 season. In July 2014, he had a trial with English club Arsenal that came to nothing. Mićanović made his first-team debut for Javor Ivanjica in March 2015, and finished the 2014–15 season with 1 goal from 6 appearances. For the first half of the 2015–16 season, Mićanović was loaned to another Serbian League team, IMT. He made his Serbian SuperLiga debut for Javor Ivanjica in the season's first spring fixture, against Radnički Niš on 21 February 2016.

Career statistics

Honours
Javor Ivanjica
Serbian First League: Runners Up 2014-15

References

External links
 Mladen Mićanović stats at utakmica.rs 
 

1996 births
Living people
Sportspeople from Šabac
Association football midfielders
Serbian footballers
FK Mačva Šabac players
FK Javor Ivanjica players
FK IMT players
FK Jedinstvo Surčin players
FK Budućnost Valjevo players
Serbian First League players
Serbian SuperLiga players